Anchorius lineatus is a species of beetle in the family Biphyllidae, the only species in the genus Anchorius.

References

Biphyllidae
Cleroidea genera